The following lists events that happened during 1952 in South Africa.

Incumbents
 Monarch: King George VI (until 6 February), Queen Elizabeth II (starting 6 February).
 Governor-General and High Commissioner for Southern Africa: Ernest George Jansen.
 Prime Minister: Daniel François Malan.
 Chief Justice: Albert van der Sandt Centlivres.

Events

March
 23 – Ex-regent Mshiyeni, uncle of Zulu King Cyprian Bhekuzulu kaSolomon, warns the Zulu people not to participate in the Defiance Campaign. In the press the King repeatedly denies having any views on the matter.

April
 6 – The African National Congress, South African Indian Congress and the Coloured People's Congress launch the Defiance Campaign against apartheid.
 6 – The Van Riebeeck Festival is held in Cape Town, marking the 300th anniversary of the landing by Jan van Riebeeck at Table Bay.

May
 3 – The first regular jet flight between South Africa and Britain is started with the arrival of a De Havilland Comet with 36 passengers at Johannesburg.

October
 8 – A uranium plant operated by West Rand Consolidated Mines, the first in the world to extract uranium as a by-product of the gold refining process, opens at Millsite near Krugersdorp.
 12 – The first uranium is worked at the West Rand plant.

Unknown date
 Nelson Mandela is given a 9-month suspended sentence and is forbidden to leave Johannesburg for the next 6 months.

Births
 23 January – Omar Henry, cricket administrator.
 22 February – Bheki Cele, minister of police
 26 February – Patrick Ntsoelengoe Ace Ntsoelengoe, soccer player. (d. 2006).
 26 April – Popo Molefe, co-founder of the Azanian People's Organisation.
 12 May – Membathisi Mdladlana, politician.
 26 June – Simon Mann, British Army officer, security expert and mercenary.
 1 July – Dale Hayes, professional golfer.
 29 July – Patrick Soon-Shiong, transplant surgeon, billionaire businessman, bioscientist, and media proprietor
 2 September – Regardt van den Bergh, director, producer, writer and actor.
24 September – Kagiso Patrick Mautloa, artist.
 23 October – Antjie Krog, poet, novelist, playwright and journalist.
 27 October – Cyril Ramaphosa, President of the Republic of South Africa
 1 December – Sonja Herholdt, singer.
 14 December – Koos Bekker, billionaire businessman, and the chairman of media group Naspers.

Deaths
 28 March – Sir Fraser Russell, three times acting Governor of Southern Rhodesia. (b. 1876)

Railways

Railway lines opened
 18 December – Free State: Odendaalsrus to Allanridge, .

Locomotives
Two new Cape gauge locomotive types enter service on the South African Railways (SAR):
 The first of one hundred Class S2 0-8-0 shunting steam locomotives.
 The first of forty Class 4E electric locomotives, acquired to work the mainline from Cape Town across the Hex River Railpass to Touws River in the Karoo.

References

History of South Africa